Yazhou is a county-level district under the jurisdiction of the city of Sanya, Hainan. The district was established on 12 February 2014, and is Sanya's westernmost district.

Former administrative subdivisions
Yazhou has jurisdiction over the former towns of:

References

External links

Sanya
County-level divisions of Hainan